The fifth Tommy Murphy Cup Gaelic football competition commenced on July 12, 2008. The competition was in knockout format: the nine teams who play in the National Football League 2009 Division 4 competed. Antrim beat holders Wicklow in the final.

Teams competing
Antrim
Clare
Carlow
Kilkenny
Leitrim
London
Sligo
Waterford
Wicklow

2008 Games

Tommy Murphy Cup
Tommy Murphy Cup